WKTF (1550 AM) is a radio station broadcasting a Variety format. It is licensed to Vienna, Georgia, United States. The station is currently owned by Hammett Financial Management Corporation.

After several extended periods of silence over the years, Hammett Financial Management took over operation of WKTF on June 1, 2019, under a time brokerage agreement, pending consummation of the purchase of the station from Len Radio.

References

External links
 

Southern Gospel radio stations in the United States
KTF